Lennart Carlsson (born 28 August 1951) is a Swedish speed skater. He competed in three events at the 1976 Winter Olympics.

References

External links
 

1951 births
Living people
Swedish male speed skaters
Olympic speed skaters of Sweden
Speed skaters at the 1976 Winter Olympics
People from Karlsborg Municipality
Sportspeople from Västra Götaland County
20th-century Swedish people